Beijo 2348/72 is a 1990 Brazilian film directed by Walter Rogério. The film was released after four years in 1994.

Cast 
Maitê Proença.... Catarina
Chiquinho Brandão.... Norival
Fernanda Torres.... Claudete
Antônio Fagundes.... dr. Paulo
Ary Fontoura.... Alvarino
Cláudio Mamberti.... Norival lawyer
Miguel Falabella.... Zeca
Iara Jamra.... Cármen
Joel Barcelos ...archivist
Gianfrancesco Guarnieri.... photographer
Eloísa Mafalda.... pension owner
Walmor Chagas.... Supreme Court Judge
Miriam Pires.... workwoman
Sérgio Mamberti.... judge
Genival Lacerda.... singer 
Dani Patarra.... Dolores

Awards 
1990: Festival de Brasília
Best Picture (won)
Best Actor (Chiquinho Brandão) (won)
Best Supporting Actor (Joel Barcelos) (won)

1990: Gramado Film Festival
Best Picture  (Nominee)
Best Editing (won)
Best Cinematography (won)

Reception 
The critic of the newspaper Folha de S. Paulo wrote: "Without any social criticism but joyfully presenting the miseries of the proletariat, "Beijo 2348/72" thus benefits from a peculiar comic lightness."

References

External links 
 

1990 films
1990s Portuguese-language films
Brazilian comedy films
Brazilian drama films